Elif Elmas (born 24 September 1999) is a Macedonian professional footballer who plays as a midfielder for  club Napoli and the North Macedonia national team.

Club career

Early career
Elmas started his career at FK Rabotnički in his native Macedonia. After a stand-out season in which he scored 6 league goals and led Rabotnički to a third-place finish in the Macedonian First Football League in 2016–17, he joined Turkish giants Fenerbahçe on a deal until 2022, with Fenerbahçe paying the former €300,000 for his services. The attacking midfielder went on to score four goals in over 40 appearances for the Yellow Canaries in all competitions before moving to Italy in July 2019.

Napoli
On 24 July 2019, Serie A side S.S.C. Napoli announced the signing of Elmas from Fenerbahçe. The deal was worth a reported €16 million, which could rise to €19 million in total with bonuses – including a €1.5 million sell-on fee clause. He was disciplined by his new club after speaking to reporters while away on international duty in November 2019 for breaching a club media blackout.

Elmas scored his first Napoli goal on 3 February 2020 to help the club to a 4–2 victory over Sampdoria, and secure their third win in a row in all competitions.

On 19 December 2021, Elmas scored the winner for Napoli in a narrow away win against AC Milan, taking over second place in Serie A.

International career
Elmas was born in Macedonia to a family of Turkish descent. In July 2017 it was reported that the then coach of the Turkey national football team, Fatih Terim, had tried to call him up, but Elmas decided to represent his birth country.

On 11 June 2017, at the age of 17, Elmas made his debut for the Macedonia national team in a FIFA World Cup qualifier against Spain by coming in at halftime as a substitute for Ostoja Stjepanović.

Elmas was also included in the Macedonia U21 squad for the 2017 UEFA European Under-21 Championship in Poland, and he was in fact the youngest one in the 23-player squad.

On 31 March 2021, he scored the winning goal for North Macedonia in a 2–1 away win over Germany during the 2022 FIFA World Cup qualification.

On 14 November 2021, Elmas scored a brace in a 3–1 win against Iceland, and helped the team secure a runners-up spot in Group J, and a World Cup play-off.

Career statistics

Club

International

Scores and results list North Macedonia's goal tally first, score column indicates score after each Elmas goal.

Honours
Rabotnički
Macedonian Football Cup runner-up: 2015–16

Napoli
Coppa Italia: 2019–20

Individual
Macedonian Footballer of the Year: 2019

References

External links

Profile at the S.S.C. Napoli website
 Profile at Macedonian Football 
 sport.de
 

1999 births
Living people
Footballers from Skopje
Macedonian people of Turkish descent
Association football midfielders
Macedonian footballers
North Macedonia youth international footballers
North Macedonia under-21 international footballers
North Macedonia international footballers
FK Rabotnički players
Fenerbahçe S.K. footballers
S.S.C. Napoli players
Macedonian First Football League players
Süper Lig players
Serie A players
UEFA Euro 2020 players
Macedonian expatriate footballers
Expatriate footballers in Turkey
Macedonian expatriate sportspeople in Turkey
Expatriate footballers in Italy
Macedonian expatriate sportspeople in Italy